Aonides is a genus of annelids belonging to the family Spionidae.

The genus has cosmopolitan distribution.

Species:

Aonides californiensis 
Aonides glandulosa 
Aonides mayaguezensis 
Aonides nodosetosa 
Aonides orensanzi 
Aonides oxycephala 
Aonides paucibranchiata 
Aonides selvagensis 
Aonides trifida

References

Annelids